Jean-Marc Barr (born September 27, 1960) is a French-American film actor and director. He is best known for working on several films from Danish film director and frequent collaborator Lars von Trier since Europa (1991).

Early life and education

Barr was born to a French mother and an American father working in the United States Armed Forces. He is fluent in both French and English. Barr was born in West Germany where his father was stationed, and lived an itinerant childhood. His family moved to France in 1968, then to California in 1974.
	
Barr's parents wished for him to join the armed forces, but he was unwilling to follow in his father's footsteps. He studied philosophy at the University of California, Los Angeles, then at the Paris Conservatoire and the Sorbonne. He moved to London to pursue an education in drama at the Guildhall School of Music and Drama.

Career 
Barr began working in theatre in France in 1986. After finding work in television (including a small role in Hotel du Lac (1986), the BBC's version of the Booker prize-winning novel by Anita Brookner), and film (in particular Hope and Glory (1987) by John Boorman), he was cast in the tremendously successful The Big Blue (1988). Luc Besson cast him in the role of French diver Jacques Mayol, alongside Rosanna Arquette and Jean Reno. The Big Blue was the most financially successful film in France in the 1980s.

In 1991, Barr starred in Danish director Lars von Trier's Europa, marking the beginning of a long friendship (he is the godfather of von Trier's children) as well as a significant professional relationship. He went on to appear in von Trier's Breaking the Waves (1996), Dancer in the Dark (2000), Dogville (2004), Manderlay (2005), The Boss of It All (2006) and Nymph()maniac (2013). In 2005 he starred in the French film Crustacés et Coquillages. In 1999 he starred in the French cinéma du corps/cinema of the body drama film, Don't Let Me Die on a Sunday (French: J'aimerais pas crever un dimanche), directed by Didier Le Pêcheur.

Barr's collaboration with von Trier put him on track to start directing his own work. He debuted in 1999 as a director, screenwriter and producer with the intimate love story Lovers. The film became the first part of a trilogy; the films that followed were the drama Too Much Flesh (2000) and the comedy Being Light (2001), which he co-directed with Pascal Arnold. Barr and Pascal also directed the 2006 film Chacun sa nuit (eng: One to another), where they first discovered Lizzie Brocher, Arthur Dupont and Karl E. Landler. This was followed by another collaboration in 2012, Sexual Chronicles of a French Family.

In 1997, Barr appeared in The Scarlet Tunic, produced by Zigi Kamasa. He appeared as Hugo in The Red Siren in 2002 and played divorce lawyer Maître Bertram in the 2003 Merchant Ivory film le Divorce.  He appeared as the titular character in the video for Blur's 1996 single, "Charmless Man".

In 2010, he starred in Kim Nguyen's film City of Shadows (La Cité). Barr played author Jack Kerouac in the 2013 film adaptation of the Beat Generation autobiographical novel Big Sur.

Filmography

Film

Television

References

External links

 Biography at zoom-cinema.fr
Photos Jean-Marc Barr, Berlin 2001

1960 births
Living people
People from Bitburg
American male film actors
American male stage actors
American male television actors
French male film actors
French male stage actors
French male television actors
University of California, Los Angeles alumni
University of Paris alumni
French emigrants to the United States
Alumni of the Guildhall School of Music and Drama
American expatriates in Germany
American expatriates in England